Irala is a village in Chittoor district of the Indian state of Andhra Pradesh. It is the mandal headquarters of Irala mandal.

See also
Errepalli

References 

Villages in Chittoor district
Mandal headquarters in Chittoor district